The Premios 40 Principales for Best Spanish Artist or Group is an honor presented annually at Los Premios 40 Principales. It appeared first on the 2011 edition as a result of the merging of the Best Solo and Best Group categories from the previous editions.

References

Los Premios 40 Principales
2011 establishments in Spain
Awards established in 2011